The Road to Gandolfo is a story by Michael Shepherd (a pen name used by Robert Ludlum) about General MacKenzie Hawkins ("The Hawk"), a military legend and Army veteran. He defaces an important Chinese memorial as a result of being drugged by a Chinese general and is later kicked out of the Army. Seeking revenge, he plots to kidnap the Pope Francis I and hold him for ransom of $400 million, one dollar for every Catholic in the world.

The only person who can stop him is Sam Devereaux, an army lawyer who rescues the Hawk from China but subsequently himself gets trapped in the Hawk's plan. The story revolves around how Hawkins executes the mission with amazing precision and discipline along with his band of seven provocateurs and the unexpected reaction by Pope Francis.

Additional information
Unlike the usual books by Ludlum, this one tends to be overwhelmingly humorous. There is a sequel to this story called The Road to Omaha.
The character MacKenzie Hawkins is also mentioned fleetingly in Robert Ludlum's novel The Bourne Identity, where he is mentioned to have previously served in Burma.

Publication history

1975, US, Dial Press , Pub date January 1975, Hardback
1982, US, Bantam Books , Pub date July 1, 1982, Paperback
1976, UK, Grafton  Pub date August 23, 1976, Hardback
1992, UK, HarperCollins , Pub date March 26, 1992, Paperback

External links
The Road to Gandolfo - Robert Ludlum Book Review

1975 American novels
Novels by Robert Ludlum
American comedy novels
Works published under a pseudonym